This is the discography of Reef the Lost Cauze, an American rapper from Philadelphia, Pennsylvania, United States.

Albums

Solo albums
The High Life (2001)
Invisible Empire (2003)
Feast or Famine (2005)
A Vicious Cycle (2008)
High Life 2013 (2013)
The Majestic (2018)

Collaborative albums
Black Candles (with JuJu Mob) (2005)
The Torture Papers (with Army of the Pharaohs) (2006)
Ritual of Battle (with Army of the Pharaohs) (2007)
The Stress Files (Produced by Stress The White Boy) (2008)
The Unholy Terror (with Army of the Pharaohs) (2010)
Fight Music (Produced by Guns-N-Butter) (2010)
Your Favorite MC (Produced by Snowgoons) (2011)
The Fast Way (Produced by Emynd) (2014)
In Death Reborn (with Army of the Pharaohs) (2014)
Heavy Lies the Crown (with Army of the Pharaohs) (2014)
Furious Styles (Produced by Bear-One) (2016)
Reef the Lost Cauze is Alive (with Caliph-Now) (2022)

Extended plays
Big Deal (2009)
Sirens on Snyder (Produced by Haj of Dumhi) (2013)
Year of the Hyenas (with King Syze) (2014)
The Fast Way (with Emynd) (2014)
The Airing of Grievances (Produced by Haj of Dumhi) (2020)

Mixtapes
Long Live The Cauze Vol I (2006)
Long Live The Cauze Vol II (I Am Legend) (2008)
King & The Cauze (with King Magnetic) (2009)
Raiders of the Lost Art (2010)
Reef the Lost Cauze Is Dead (2012)

Guest appearances
Dr. Noh - Contradiction Volume 1 (2003)
??
Chief Kamachi - Cult Status (2004)
"#13" (Feat. Reef)
Random - The Call (2005)
"Luminescence" (Feat. Reef & Neo P) 
Access Immortal - New York Yankee (2006)
"The Formula Freestyle" (Feat. Reef & Verbal Tec)
Snowgoons - German Lugers (2007)
"Never" (Feat. Reef)
"No Guts No GLory" (Feat. Reef, O.C. & Rasco)
GAZA - Drumline Anthem (2007)
??
Dev Rocka - The Night Shift (2007)
"Dutches & Phillies" (Feat. NY Rhyme Exchange & Reef)
"Curtains" (Feat. Planet Asia & Reef)
"In the End" (Feat. Reef)
The Returners & Radio Rewers - Do You (2008)
"Where You Gonna Hide?" (Feat. Reef & Pumpkinhead)
Snowgoons - Black Snow (2008)
"The Curse" (Feat. King Magnetic, Charon Don, Sicknature & Reef)
"This is Where the Fun Stops" (Feat. Reef)
Rob Kelly - St Patricks Day Massacre (2009)
"Shook Crews Runnin" (Feat. Reef)
Yameen - Never Knows More (2009)
"Pull Ya Cash Out" (Feat. Maylay Sparks & Reef)
J.J. Brown - Connect the Dots (2009)
"Pure Grind" (Feat. Reef)
Le Sous Marin - Causes Perdues (2010)
"Atmosphere Primaire" (Feat. Reef) 
TReBeats - The Urge to Change Something (2011)
"Reality of Doom" (Feat. Reef, Unknown Mizery & Gutta)
Tim Timebomb - Hellcat (2013)
"If the Music Ain't Loud" (Feat. Reef & STWB)
DJ Fatte - Soundtrack (2013)
"Pochop to" (Feat. Reef & Separ)
Snowgoons - Black Snow 2 (2013)
"Party Crashers" (Feat. Reef)
"Reel Wolf: The Underworld" (GoonMusik Remix)
 Obi Khan "Voices In My Head" featuring Reef The Lost Cauze & Taiyamo Denku (2018)

Singles as featured

The Returners - "Ready for War" (Feat. A.O.T.P.) (2013)
Spirit of Truth - "No Matter What" (Feat. A.O.T.P.) (2013)

Hip hop discographies
Discographies of American artists